The 2018 Monaghan Senior Football Championship will be the 112th edition of Monaghan GAA's premier gaelic football tournament for senior clubs in County Monaghan, Ireland. Ten teams compete, with the winners representing Monaghan in the AIB GAA Ulster Club Senior Football Championship. The championship uses a double-elimination format for Rounds 1 and 2 before becoming knock-out.

Scotstown are the defending champions after defeating Magheracloone in the 2017 final, and will be aiming for their fourth consecutive title. The 2018 competition sees the return of Carrickmacross and Inniskeen to the Senior ranks following their promotion from the Intermediate competition.

Team Changes
The two bottom-placed teams in the Monaghan Senior Football League are relegated to the Intermediate ranks for the following season, with the Intermediate Football Championship winners and Intermediate Football League winners promoted in their place. If a team wins both the Intermediate Championship and League, then the next highest placed team in the League will be promoted. 

The following teams have changed division since the 2017 championship season.

To S.F.C.
Promoted from 2017 Monaghan Intermediate Football Championship
 Carrickmacross Emmets - (Championship & League winners)
 Inniskeen Grattans -  (2nd in League)

From S.F.C.
Relegated to 2018 Monaghan Intermediate Football Championship
 Donaghmoyne Fontenoys (9th in League)
 Killanny Geraldines (10th in League)

Participating Teams

Preliminary round
Four of the ten teams are drawn into the Preliminary Round. The remaining six teams are drawn in Round 1A. The winners of the two Preliminary Rounds play each other in Round 1A.

Round 1

Round 1A
The six teams not drawn in the Preliminary Round enter the competition in this round, along with the two Preliminary Round winners (who play each other). 
The four Round 1A winners proceed to Round 2A while the four losers enter the back-door in Round 1B.

Round 1B
The losers of the Preliminary Round (two teams) enter this round along with the losers of Round 1A, but not that fixture which contains the Preliminary Round winners (three teams). A draw will be made to determine the two pairings, with the fifth team obtaining a bye into Round 2B.
Two teams will exit the competition at this stage.

The following teams are eligible to take part in Round 1B -

  Monaghan Harps ;

  Latton ;

  Inniskeen ;

  Magheracloone ;

  Carrickmacross ;

One team will receive a bye into Round 2B.

Round 2

Round 2A
The four winners from Round 1A play each other. The two winners proceed to the semi-finals while the losers must play in Round 3.

The following teams are eligible to take part in Round 2A -

  Clontibret O'Neills;

  Ballybay Pearse Brothers;

  Scotstown ;

  Castleblayney ;

Round 2B
The two winners from Round 1B, one team who received a bye through Round 1B and the loser of the Round 1A tie involving the Preliminary Round winners play in this round. The winners will proceed to Round 3 while the losers will exit the championship.
The following teams are eligible to take part in Round 2B -

  Magheracloone ;

  Truagh ;

  Inniskeen ;

  Carrickmacross ;

Round 3
The two winners from Round 2B play the two losers from Round 2A. The winners proceed to the semi-finals while the losers exit the championship.

The following teams are eligible to take part in Round 3 -

  Castleblayney ;

  Magheracloone ;

  Truagh ;

  Ballybay Pearse Brothers ;

Semi-finals
The two winners from Round 2A play the two winners from Round 3.

Final

See also
2018 AIB Ulster Club Senior Football Championship

References

Monaghan SFC
Monaghan Senior Football Championship
Monaghan Senior Football Championship